The following active airports serve the Thunder Bay area of Ontario, Canada:

See also
 List of airports in the Bala, Ontario area
 List of airports in the Bracebridge area
 List of airports in the Fergus area
 List of airports in the London, Ontario area
 List of airports in the Ottawa area
 List of airports in the Parry Sound area
 List of airports in the Port Carling area
 List of airports in the Sault Ste. Marie, Ontario area
 List of airports in the Greater Toronto Area

References 

 
Thunder Bay
Airports
Thunder Bay
Airports